Neil Edwin Roberts (born 15 June 1933) is a former Australian rules footballer in the Victorian Football League (VFL) and Brownlow Medalist.

Early life
Neil Roberts was born on 15 June 1933 to parents Edwin (Ted) Roberts (a former soccer player who migrated from England to East Brighton, Victoria) and Lelia Elfreda Roberts, nee Kilby. Roberts attended Melbourne High School between 1946 and 1949. He played under 19s football at full-forward with the Melbourne High School Old Boys Football Club where he was recruited by the St Kilda.

VFL career
Roberts debuted for St Kilda in 1952 and initially played on the forward line but despite his strong overhead marking was shifted to defence due to inaccurate goalkicking and later excelled as a centre half back, winning the Brownlow Medal in 1958. He captained the side from 1959 to 1962 before retiring at 29 years of age and commencing a career in sports journalism. He was inducted to the Saints inaugural Hall of Fame in 2003.

Personal life and post football career
His son, Michael Roberts, also played for the Saints and is now a sports broadcaster.

Neil Roberts was the officer in charge of Mawson base, Antarctica, 1971–1973. He has now retired to farming.

References 

St Kilda Hall of Fame Profile
Australia Day ambassador profile

Brownlow Medal winners
Trevor Barker Award winners
1933 births
Living people
St Kilda Football Club players
All-Australians (1953–1988)
People educated at Melbourne High School
Australian rules footballers from Melbourne
Australian Football Hall of Fame inductees
People from Brighton, Victoria
Australian people of English descent